Hales Franciscan High School (known simply as Hales) was a private Catholic high school located in the Bronzeville neighborhood on the south side of Chicago, Illinois. It was part of the Archdiocese of Chicago.

Background
Since its founding, Hales Franciscan High School has celebrated African-American heritage and endeavored to instill cultural pride. Today, the school continues to be the only historically African-American, all-male, Catholic college preparatory high school in the state of Illinois and one of three such institutions in the nation. 

The school is a non-profit, independent high school, fully accredited by the North Central Association and certified by the Illinois State Board of Education. In the 2013–14 school year, the school became coed, but returned to an all-male student body for the 2015–2016 school year. 

On July 27, 2016, the school announced that the 2016–2017 academic school year would be suspended, due to low enrollment and financial struggles. In 2019, the school closed permanently
due to declining enrollment and financial struggles.

Notable alumni
 Julius Carry III - 1970, actor
D. J. Cooper (born 1990) - basketball player in the Israeli Basketball Premier League
 Rich Gardner - 1999, NFL cornerback
 JaVale McGee - 2006, basketball player
 Patrick Miller - 2010, basketball player in the Israeli Basketball Premier League
 Jerome Randle - 2006, professional basketball player

Notable staff
 Jack Ryan (2000–03) - politician. Ryan left the school to run for the open US senate seat in the 2004 election. After winning the Republican primary, his campaign was derailed when court files detailing incidents relating to his sex life with ex-wife Jeri Ryan were unsealed. The election was won by Barack Obama.

References

External links
 School website

Catholic schools in Chicago
Private high schools in Chicago
Catholic secondary schools in Illinois
Boys' schools in the United States
African-American Roman Catholic schools